Ashford Carbonell (or Ashford Carbonel) is a village and civil parish in south Shropshire, England, near the county border with Herefordshire.

The river acts as the boundary between the parishes of Ashford Bowdler and Ashford Carbonel, and is crossed locally by Ashford Bridge, which takes the Caynham Road from the A49 towards Caynham.

History

Ashford Carbonell formed part of the hundred of Culvestan, which in the 12th century became Munslow. Part of the parish (Huntington and The Serpent) however instead became part of the hundred of Stottesdon.

Huntington was a manor mentioned (separately to Ashford Carbonell) in the Domesday Book (1086). Today it is a small hamlet just outside the village. The Serpent is a former pub which gave its name to a crossroads on the Caynham Road, located midway between the villages of Ashford Carbonell and Caynham but within the parish of Ashford Carbonell. Stretton Reeve (1907-1981), Bishop of Lichfield, lived in retirement at Huntington Green.

The parish church, dedicated to Saint Mary Magdalene, is Norman in origin.

Education
On 1 November 2011, a new £3m primary school (the "Bishop Hooper School") opened on the edge of the village, which replaced the village's previous primary school and the primary school in neighbouring Caynham.

See also
Listed buildings in Ashford Carbonell

References

External links
 
 
 Huntington in OpenDomesday

Villages in Shropshire
Civil parishes in Shropshire